James Owoo (born 16 December 1927) was a Ghanaian athlete. He competed in the men's high jump at the 1952 Summer Olympics.

References

External links
 

1927 births
Possibly living people
Athletes (track and field) at the 1952 Summer Olympics
Ghanaian male high jumpers
Olympic athletes of Ghana
Place of birth missing